The shortlisted nominees for the 2018 Governor General's Awards for Literary Merit were announced on October 3, 2018, and the winners were announced on October 30.

English

French

References

External links
Governor General's Awards

Governor General's Awards
Governor General's Awards
Governor General's Awards